Rhodopsalta leptomera, also known as the sand dune redtail cicada, is a species of insect that is endemic to New Zealand. This species was first described in 1921 by J. G. Myers and named Melampsalta leptomera.

References

Cicadas of New Zealand
Insects described in 1921
Endemic fauna of New Zealand
Cicadettini
Endemic insects of New Zealand